Teller Airport  is a state-owned public-use airport located two nautical miles (4 km) south of the central business district of Teller, a city in the Nome Census Area of the U.S. state of Alaska.

Facilities and aircraft 
Teller Airport has one runway designated 7/25 with a 3,000 x 60 ft (914 x 18 m) gravel surface.

Airlines and destinations 

Prior to its bankruptcy and cessation of all operations, Ravn Alaska served the airport from multiple locations.

References

External links 
 FAA Alaska airport diagram (GIF)
 

Airports in the Nome Census Area, Alaska